Ripipterygidae is a family of insects in the order Orthoptera. Members of the family are commonly known as mud crickets.

Description

Ripipterygids are small, often dark-colored, cricket-like orthopterans, between 3 and 14 mm in length. They closely resemble the related tridactylids. Like tridactylids, they have greatly expanded hind femora, and have the ability to swim and jump from the surface of water. They can be distinguished from tridactylids by their uninflated tibiae on the middle pair of legs, unsegmented cerci, rows of comblike teeth on the epiproct, and setae at the tips of the cerciform lobes on the paraproct, as well as through characters of the genitalia.

Species in the genus Ripipteryx are typically black or dark brown and often metallic; many are boldly colored or strikingly patterned, with sharply contrasting white, yellow, and/or red markings. Members of the genus Mirhipipteryx are typically smaller and more drably colored.

Distribution and habitat

Ripipterygids are restricted to the Neotropics. They can be found from southern Mexico south to central South America. Like tridactylids, they are typically found in riparian areas, on bare soil, sand, and mud, as well as on rocks, and – in some species – low vegetation in, near, or above water. In at least some species, individuals are not distributed evenly throughout appropriate habitat, but rather are found in groups.

Biology
Ripipterygids have been comparatively little-studied, and many aspects of their biology are poorly known, with behavioral observations having only been made on a handful of species.

Locomotion
Like tridactylids, ripipterygids walk quadrupedally using only their first two pairs of legs, and the hind legs are only used for jumping and swimming. Ripipterygids fly when disturbed, often landing on water and swimming back to shore.

Diet and foraging
Ripipterygids are herbivorous, and have been recorded feeding on a variety of different plants, as well as foraging on the ground.  Foraging ripipterygids may leave networks of shallow tracks in sandy or muddy soil near waterways.

Burrowing
At least some ripipterygids build short burrows or oval-shaped cells in clay soil or sand, on both flat ground and in vertical banks. These burrows are used for temporary shelter, and may also be used for protection while molting.

Daily activity pattern
Species vary in their activity patterns; some are most active during dawn and dusk, and others are active throughout the day even in direct sunlight. One species studied was nocturnal.

Breeding
In Ripipteryx notata in Uruguay (near the southern limit of the family's geographic distribution), females oviposit eggs singly in bare soil in spring and summer. Nymphs are present in summer and early autumn (whereas adults are present year-round). Unlike in grasshoppers, embryonic molt has not been observed to occur in ripipterygids.

Predation
Fish have been recorded preying on swimming ripipterygids.

Taxonomy and evolution

Ripipterygids, tridactylids, and sandgropers comprise the superfamily Tridactyloidea within the suborder Caelifera (grasshoppers and relatives). The tridactyloids are sister to the remainder of Caelifera. Within Tridactyloidea, ripipterygids are sister to tridactylids; the two families are estimated to have diverged between 150 and 175 million years ago.

Ripipterygids were initially included in the family Tridactylidae. They were first elevated to family rank (as Rhipipterygidae) in 1939. The classification of the family was extensively revised in a series of works by Kurt Günther between the 1960s and 1990s. However, the taxonomic diversity of the family, particularly in Central America, is still incompletely known.

Two extant genera of ripipterygids are recognized: Mirhipipteryx and Ripipteryx. Since the 1960s, the genus Ripipteryx has been divided into five species groups, based primarily on characters of the male genitalia. However, there is evidence that these groups are not monophyletic. In addition, Ripipteryx itself may be paraphyletic with respect to Mirhipipteryx, suggesting additional taxonomic revision of the family is required.

Both Mirhipipteryx and Ripipteryx have representatives distributed throughout the geographic distribution of the family, as do all of the Ripipteryx species groups apart from the Scrofulosa group, the members of which are all restricted to Central America.

List of species

The following recent genera, species and subspecies of Ripipterygidae are recognized by OSF:

 Mirhipipteryx Günther, 1969
 Mirhipipteryx acuminata Günther, 1969
 Mirhipipteryx andensis Günther, 1969
 Mirhipipteryx biloba (Hebard, 1928)
 M. b. aberrans Günther, 1989
 M. b. biloba (Hebard, 1928)
 M. b. chiriquensis Günther, 1969
 M. b. incurvata Günther, 1989
 M. b. riofriensis Günther, 1969
 M. b. sevillensis Günther, 1969
 Mirhipipteryx columbiana (Günther, 1963)
 M. c. columbiana (Günther, 1963)
 M. c. tenaensis Günther, 1969
 Mirhipipteryx disparilobata Günther, 1989
 Mirhipipteryx hebardi (Chopard, 1931)
 Mirhipipteryx hondurica Günther, 1969
 Mirhipipteryx hubbelli Günther, 1969
 Mirhipipteryx imperfecta Günther, 1989
 Mirhipipteryx lilo Günther, 1969
 M. lil. granchacensis Günther, 1977
 M. lil. lilo Günther, 1969
 Mirhipipteryx lineata Günther, 1989
 M. lin. anchicayensis Günther, 1994
 M. lin. lineata Günther, 1989
 Mirhipipteryx lucieni Günther, 1969
 Mirhipipteryx magdalenensis Günther, 1969
 Mirhipipteryx panamica Günther, 1969
 Mirhipipteryx peruviana (Saussure, 1896)
 Mirhipipteryx phallica Günther, 1969
 Mirhipipteryx pronotopunctata Günther, 1969
 Mirhipipteryx pulicaria (Saussure, 1896)
 M. pu. interposita Günther, 1969
 M. pu. pulicaria (Saussure, 1896)
 Mirhipipteryx schuchmanni Günther, 1994
 Mirhipipteryx striatipes (Chopard, 1954)
 Mirhipipteryx triangulata Günther, 1969
 Mirhipipteryx unispinosa Günther, 1989
 Mirhipipteryx variabilis Günther, 1969
 Mirhipipteryx venezuelensis Günther, 1976
 Ripipteryx Newman, 1834
 Limbata-Marginata group 
 Ripipteryx boliviana Bruner, 1916
 Ripipteryx cruciata Bruner, 1916
 Ripipteryx cyanipennis Saussure, 1874
 Ripipteryx furcata Günther, 1976
 Ripipteryx hydrodroma Saussure, 1896
 Ripipteryx lawrencei Günther, 1969
 Ripipteryx limbata (Burmeister, 1838)
 Ripipteryx marginata Newman, 1834
 Ripipteryx notata (Burmeister, 1838)
 Ripipteryx ornata Chopard, 1927
 Ripipteryx rivularia Saussure, 1896
 Ripipteryx saopauliensis Günther, 1969
 Ripipteryx trilobata Saussure, 1874
 Ripipteryx trimaculata Günther, 1969
 Crassicornis group
 Ripipteryx antennata Hebard, 1924
 Ripipteryx atra Serville, 1838
 Ripipteryx capotensis Günther, 1970
 Ripipteryx crassicornis Günther, 1969
 Ripipteryx gorgonaensis Baena-Bejarano & Heads, 2015
 Ripipteryx laticornis Günther, 1963
 Ripipteryx nodicornis Hebard, 1924
 Forceps group
 Ripipteryx carbonaria Saussure, 1896
 Ripipteryx diegoi Baena-Bejarano, 2015
 Ripipteryx ecuadoriensis Günther, 1962
 Ripipteryx forceps Saussure, 1896
 Ripipteryx nigra Günther, 1963
 Ripipteryx paraprocessata Günther, 1989
 Ripipteryx pasochoensis Heads, 2010
 Ripipteryx processata Günther, 1969
 Marginipennis group
 Ripipteryx amazonica Günther, 1969
 Ripipteryx brasiliensis Günther, 1969
 Ripipteryx bruneri Chopard, 1920
 Ripipteryx difformipes Chopard, 1956
 Ripipteryx femorata Chopard, 1956
 Ripipteryx guacharoensis Baena-Bejarano & Heads, 2015
 Ripipteryx insignis Chopard, 1937
 Ripipteryx luteicornis Chopard, 1920
 Ripipteryx marginipennis Bruner, 1916
 Ripipteryx sturmi Günther, 1963
 Ripipteryx vicina Chopard, 1956
 Scrofulosa group
 Ripipteryx biolleyi Saussure, 1896
 Ripipteryx mediolineata Günther, 1969
 Ripipteryx mexicana Saussure, 1859
 Ripipteryx mopana Heads & Taylor, 2012
 Ripipteryx saltator Saussure, 1896
 Ripipteryx saussurei Günther, 1969
 Ripipteryx scrofulosa Saussure, 1896
 Ripipteryx tricolor Saussure, 1896

In addition, two fossil species have been described, both based on individuals preserved in amber in regions of the world where the family no longer occurs: Mirhipipteryx antillarum Heads, 2010 (from early Miocene amber from Hispaniola), and Archaicaripipteryx rotunda Xu, Zhang, Jarzembowski & Fang, 2020 (from mid-Cretaceous Burmese amber).

References

External links
 
 
 observations of Ripipterygidae on iNaturalist

Caelifera
Orthoptera families